Achatz is a surname of German and Dutch origin. Notable people with the surname include:

 Dag Achatz (born 1942), Swedish classical pianist
 Grant Achatz (born 1974), American chef

References

German-language surnames
Dutch-language surnames